Naolinco is a small city in Veracruz, Mexico. It is named after Guadalupe Victoria, also known as Naolinco de Victoria. It is on Federal Highways 190 and 180. It has borders with Xalapa, Acatlán, Tepetlán, and Coacoatzintla.

Naolinco is known for its leather-crafts.

As in other regions of the country and the region, water pollution is a major problem affecting the inhabitants of the area. In Naolinco there are numerous cases of people suffering from congenital (birth) diseases as well as health alterations linked to cancer. Similarly, many inhabitants burn waste and trash affecting air quality and generating even more pollution problems with health consequences. The lack of drinking water and environmental education cause serious problems for the municipality.
Based on data from Mexican Social Security Institute, there is evidence and recorded cases of people affected by Skin Cancer, Down syndrome and Autism.
Also, Xalapa Naolinco next town, has high levels of environmental pollution.

External links 
  Municipal Official Site

Populated places in Veracruz